Sherman High School may refer to one of these U.S. high schools:

Sherman High School (Moro, Oregon)
Sherman High School (Texas) 
Sherman High School (Seth, West Virginia)
 Sherman Central School (including the high school), a high school in New York